Deb Baker (born 1953) is an American mystery writer from the Upper Peninsula of Michigan, who has created three mystery series.

Biography
Baker was born in Escanaba, Michigan. She lived in the Upper Peninsula until she was 10. Baker lived in Gladstone, Michigan before moving to De Pere, Wisconsin where she graduated from De Pere High School. She earned a degree in English with emphasis on creative writing from the University of Wisconsin and began her writing career. She currently resides in North Lake, Wisconsin.

Baker writes American mystery fiction, especially in the cozy subgenre. She has written two series under her own name. The Dolls To Die For series features a Phoenix, Arizona doll collecting club and member Gretchen Birch, who solves murders with her new age Aunt Nina while sharing a doll restoration business with her mother. Baker is an "avid doll collector herself." Baker also wrote the humorous Yooper mysteries centering on a fictitious town in the Michigan Upper Peninsula where Gertie Johnson, mother of the local sheriff, solves murders the old fashioned way with friends Cora Mae and Kitty. The Yooper series was called a "quirky, very appealing series" by Booklist. Using the pen name Hannah Reed, she writes the Queen Bee mystery series about Story Fischer, a Wisconsin beekeeper.

Baker’s first novel, Murder Passes the Buck (2006), was based on her personal experience in the Michigan Upper Peninsula. The colorful characters she created won her the Authorlink International First Novelist Award  in the mystery category, then went on to win Best of Show.

Bibliography

As Deb Baker

Gertie Johnson
Murder Passes the Buck
Murder Grins and Bears It 2007. Llewellyn/Midnight Ink.   
Murder Talks Turkey May 2008. 264p. Llewellyn/Midnight Ink,  
Murder Bites the Bullet
Cooking Can Be Murder
Gertie Johnson Boxed Set

Gretchen Birch Murder Mysteries
Dolled Up For Murder
Goodbye Dolly
Dolly Departed
Guise and Dolls (originally published as Ding Dong Dead)
Gretchen Birch Boxed Set'

As Hannah Reed

Queen Bee MysteriesBuzz Off (2010)Mind Your Own Beeswax (2011)Plan Bee (2012)Beeline to Trouble (2012)Beewitched (2013)''

References

External links
Berkley Prime Crime
Deb Baker Official Website
Hannah Reed Official Website

1953 births
Living people
21st-century American novelists
American mystery writers
American women novelists
Novelists from Michigan
Women mystery writers
21st-century American women writers